The masked flowerpiercer (Diglossa cyanea) is a species of bird in the tanager family, Thraupidae. It is found in humid montane forest and scrub in Venezuela, Colombia, Ecuador, Peru and Bolivia. Flowerpiercers got their name from the fact that they have a sharp hook on the tip of their upper mandible which they use to slice open the base of flowers to get at the nectar.

Description
The adult male is deep ultramarine blue with a dark mask. The beak is large, black, and upturned, with a characteristic hook on the tip of the upper mandible. The iris is bright red. The female is similar in appearance but altogether duller. The juvenile has a reddish-brown iris. At the northern end of its range, the song is a series of reedlike notes terminating in a twitter, while at the southern end, it is a jangling series of high-pitched notes ending with several lengthy "tseee" notes. These differing songs suggest that the northerly and southerly populations may be different species.

Distribution and habitat
The masked flowerpiercer is endemic to the Andes in South America where its range extends from Venezuela and Colombia, through Ecuador and Peru to Bolivia.

Ecology
This bird is often seen in small groups or mixed flocks, foraging through the foliage for insects and fruit, and probing into flowers with its beak. The flowers of the small tree Axinaea sclerophylla are pollinated by birds, the pollen being liberated in a puff when the stamens are manipulated. During a research study, the only bird seen visiting the flowers was the masked flowerpiercer, which proceeded to pull off and consume the stamens, one at a time.

Breeding takes place between June and September in Colombia, but in other parts of the range, juveniles have been seen at various times of year. The nest is a cup-shaped construction, built in a bush, and composed of mosses and dry grasses and lined with feathers. The eggs are pale bluish-green blotched and speckled with reddish-brown.

Status
The masked flowerpiercer is described as being common within its very wide range.  The International Union for Conservation of Nature has assessed its conservation status as being of "least concern" due to its stable population and lack of threats.

Gallery

References

masked flowerpiercer
Birds of the Northern Andes
masked flowerpiercer
Taxonomy articles created by Polbot
Taxa named by Frédéric de Lafresnaye